Mehran Rajabi (born 31 December 1961 in Karaj) is an Iranian actor.

Biography
He is originally from the village of Varian, Chalous Road, Iran, and his father was a gardener and farmer.He experienced his first appearance in front of the camera in 1997 in the TV series "Hemmat School Kids". His first presence in Iranian cinema was in front of Reza Mirkarimi's camera in "The Child and the Soldier". Also he is such a Khayehmal person.

He had COVID-19 in September 2020, and for this reason he was hospitalized for a few days in a hospital in Zanjan, and rumors were circulating that his general condition was deteriorating. He was finally released from the hospital after 15 days and mentioned this on his Instagram page.

Filmography
Tweezers
Blade and Termeh
Taboo
The Lizard
Three Women
Ekhrajiha 2
Koudak va sarbaz
Kolah too Kolah
Doctors' Building
Bachelors
Flying Passion
Soorati
Divorce Iranian Style
Zirzamin
Roozegar-e Gharib

References

External links

Mehran Rajabi in Soureh Cinema

Living people
1961 births
People from Karaj
Iranian male film actors
Iranian male television actors
Volunteer Basij personnel of the Iran–Iraq War